Karim Hendou, also known as Karim Khendu, (born May 27, 1986 in Algiers) is an Algerian footballer who plays for ASM Oran.

Personal
Hendou was born in Algiers, Algeria to an Algerian father and a Ukrainian mother. His family moved to Ukraine when he was a child, and Hendou lived there for 12 years before moving back to Algeria to play for JS El Biar.

International career
In 2004, Hendou was capped by Ukraine at the Under-18 level, making 6 appearances.

In 2009, Hendou was called up to the Algerian A' National team and played in a friendly against JS Kabylie.

Honours
 Finalist of the Algerian Cup once with USM El Harrach in 2011

References

External links
 
  Украина. Премьер-лига – Карим Хенду – Чемпионат.com
  Karim Hendou at Footballdatabase

1986 births
Living people
Algerian footballers
FC Shakhtar Donetsk players
FC Zorya Luhansk players
Footballers from Algiers
Ukrainian people of Algerian descent
Algerian people of Ukrainian descent
USM El Harrach players
Algeria A' international footballers
Algerian Ligue Professionnelle 1 players
JS El Biar players
Association football midfielders
Ukrainian First League players
Ukrainian Second League players